Michael Buchheit (born 25 October 1967) is a German lightweight rower. He won a gold medal at the 1989 World Rowing Championships in Bled with the lightweight men's four.

References

1967 births
Living people
West German male rowers
German male rowers
World Rowing Championships medalists for West Germany
Olympic rowers of Germany
Rowers at the 1996 Summer Olympics